Pacocahua  is a mountain in the Andes of Peru, about  high. It is situated in the Puno Region, El Collao Province, Santa Rosa District, and in the Puno Province, Acora District. It lies south of Coline and southeast of Arichua.

Name

References

Mountains of Puno Region
Mountains of Peru